Simon Lazarus (1807–1877) was an American clothing retailer and the founder of the predecessor of what was to become The F&R Lazarus & Co., an operation which blossomed into what is today known as Macy's, Inc, a major retail holding company in the U.S.

Early life
In 1850, Lazarus, a rabbinical scholar, arrived in Columbus, and in 1851 he opened the Lazarus store. Assisted by his wife Amelia and sons Fred and Ralph, Simon and his store gradually began to prosper.  Simon Lazarus was once described as "a good man, a gentle man, a scholar--and no merchant,"—and Simon's own grandson, the late Robert Lazarus, Sr., was the man who said it. By 1870, industry improvements (primarily attributable to the mass manufacture of men's uniforms for the Civil War), led the family to expand the business to include ready-made men's civilian clothing and eventually a complete line of merchandise. Simon Lazarus served as the first Rabbi of Central Ohio's oldest Reform synagogue, Temple Israel.

Later Simon sons, Fred Lazarus, Sr. and Ralph Lazarus, joined the business, adding many innovative marketing techniques. After Simon's death in 1877, his widow Amelia continued running the store with their two sons. After Amelia's death in 1899, the store was renamed The F&R Lazarus & Company and positioned for rapid expansion of the company.

Lazarus was interred at Green Lawn Cemetery in Columbus, Ohio.

References

External links

Biographical information
 Many Happy Returns to Lazarus WOSU-TV Documentary
 Charles Lazarus Interview Columbus Jewish Historical Society
 Former Lazarus Chairman and Federated Director Charles Lazarus Dies at Age 93, Columbus Dispatch, May 14, 2007
 Charles Lazarus Recalled as Retail and Civic Leader, Columbus Dispatch, May 15, 2007
Temple Israel Columbus History
 Best of times: Staffers remember when work seemed like a family, Columbus Business First, December 21, 2001
 Biography of Ralph Lazarus (1914 - 1988) University of Cincinnati
 Great Living Cincinnatians:  Fred Lazarus, Jr. Greater Cincinnati Chamber of Commerce
 Prospecting Pays Time Magazine, December 9, 1946
 Shuffling the Lazari Time Magazine, September 29, 1967
 Time to Get Involved  Time Magazine, January 19, 1968
 Personalities Time Magazine, April 3, 1964
 Family Affair Time Magazine, September 8, 1958
 How Much is Enough? Time Magazine, July 16, 1945
 Obituary of Philanthropist and New York Yankees Owner Charlotte Lazarus New York Times
 Interview with Charlotte Lazarus Witkind Columbus Jewish Historical Society

Other 
 History of Federated Department Stores
 WOSU-TV Documentary: Many Happy Returns to Lazarus Documentary
 Business First Article:  Staffers Remember When Work Seemed Like a Family
 Business First Article:  So Long, Lazarus
 Columbus Dispatch Article:  Name Change Hurt Macy's:  Decision to drop ‘Lazarus’ not a hit here
 

1820 births
1877 deaths
American businesspeople in retailing
American Jews
American retail chief executives
Lazarus, Simon
19th-century American businesspeople